The striated antthrush (Chamaeza nobilis) is a species of bird in the family Formicariidae.
It is found in Bolivia, Brazil, Colombia, Ecuador, and Peru.
Its natural habitat is subtropical or tropical moist lowland forests.

The striated antthrush was described by the English ornithologist and bird artist John Gould in 1855 and given its current binomial name Chamaeza nobilis.

References

Further reading

striated antthrush
Birds of the Amazon Basin
striated antthrush
Taxonomy articles created by Polbot